Manuel Juan Francisco del Cristo de la Victoria Prieto Comesaña aka Manuel Manquiña (born 2 August 1953 in Vigo, Galicia) is a Spanish actor.

Biography 
His career begun in 1982 in several TV comedy programs by TVG and several movies directed by Galician filmmakers like Antonio Blanco in La matanza caníbal de los garrulos lisérgicos and Xavier Valverde's Tacón and Continental. In 1997 received acknowledgment after acting in Juanma Bajo Ulloa's Airbag and Torrente, el brazo tonto de la ley. Other films and TV series are Héroes and  Historias de Bolsillo written by himself and Moncloa ¿dígame? and Manolito Gafotas (based on Elvira Lindo's child books) with others.

External links 
 
 Manuel Manquiña en AVG

Living people
1953 births
People from Vigo
Spanish male television actors
Spanish male film actors
20th-century Spanish male actors
21st-century Spanish male actors